Rzym  is a village in the administrative district of Gmina Rogowo, within Żnin County, Kuyavian-Pomeranian Voivodeship, in north-central Poland.

'Rzym' is the Polish name for Rome. The village Wenecja (Venice) is located nearby.

The village has a population of 90.

References

Rzym